Lester Sterling OD (born 31 January 1936), also known as Lester "Ska" Sterling or Mr. Versatile, is a Jamaican trumpet and saxophone player.

Biography
Like many Jamaican musicians of his generation, Sterling attended the Alpha Boys School. Originally a trumpeter, he is predominantly known as a player of alto saxophone. He was a member of the Jamaica Military Band in the 1950s and played trumpet in Val Bennett's band in 1957. In the late 1950s and early 1960s, Sterling played regularly as a studio musician, along with most of the future Skatalites members, in bands such as Clue J & His Blues Blasters.

Sterling is a founding member of The Skatalites (playing alto saxophone), one of only two (the other is Doreen Shaffer) still alive. After The Skatalites originally disbanded in 1965, Sterling played with Byron Lee & the Dragonaires and recorded several solo singles for the London-based producer "Sir" Clancy Collins. His debut solo album, Bangarang, was released on Pama Records in 1969. Sterling rejoined the Skatalites when they reformed in 1975. The band have continued on and off with a varying line-up since, and Sterling is the only founding member still with the band.
Sterling was awarded the Order of Distinction in 1998 in recognition of his contribution to Jamaican music.
Sterling's brother is keyboard player Keith Sterling.
Lester Sterling the only living foundation member of the original Skatalites band was honored by the USA chapter of JAVAA - "JAVAA USA.ORG" at their first awards ceremony held in Brooklyn New York in April 2013. That event was launched under the distinguished patronage of the consulate general of Jamaica Mr. LaMont, Mr Sterling was given a pioneers awards in the field of music for his contribution since nineteen sixty four and continues to doing it.

Discography

Albums
Bangarang (1969), Pama
Sterling Silver (2002)  Echo Records

as a featured artist
The Ska-Flames featuring Laurel Aitken, Roland Alphonso & Lester Sterling - Damn Good (1995), Sun Shot

References

1936 births
Living people
Musicians from Kingston, Jamaica
Jamaican reggae musicians
Jamaican ska musicians
The Skatalites members
Recipients of the Order of Distinction
21st-century saxophonists
21st-century trumpeters
Jamaican military musicians